Katherine Harris (born 1957) is an American politician.

Katherine Harris may also refer to:

Katherine Safford Harris, American psychologist
Katherine Corri Harris (1890–1927), American actress

See also
Katy Harris, fictional character in Coronation Street
Catherine Harris, Australian businesswoman